Theodore was the Syriac Orthodox patriarch of Antioch whose term began between 649 and 651 and ended with his death between 664 and 667.

According to Bar Hebraeus, Theodore was a monk in the desert of Skete in Egypt who later moved to the monastery of Qenneshre in Syria. He was consecrated as patriarch of Antioch by the bishop Abraham of Emesa. Sources disagree on the date of Theodore's consecration as patriarch, as it is placed in December 649 by Bar Hebraeus in his Ecclesiastical History, whilst the Zuqnin Chronicle dates the consecration to 650/1. He continued to reside at Qenneshre for the duration of his term as patriarch.

The vita of Theodotus of Amida relates that, when the young Theodotus, a monk of Qenneshre, was preparing to leave the monastery, Theodore convinced him to prolong his stay for one year because he foresaw that his own death was approaching. Theodotus remained in Qenneshre until Theodore's death, and attended the patriarch's funeral before making a pilgrimage to the Holy Land and Egypt. The vita also attests that the patriarch was mourned by Christians and Muslims alike. According to the Zuqnin Chronicle, as well as the Chronicle of 819 and Chronicle of 846, Theodore's death was in 664/5, whereas it is dated to 666/7 by Bar Hebraeus.

References

Bibliography
Primary sources

Secondary sources

Year of birth unknown
660s deaths
Syriac Patriarchs of Antioch from 512 to 1783
7th-century Oriental Orthodox archbishops
7th-century Syrian people
Christians from the Umayyad Caliphate
Christians of the Rashidun Caliphate